The Energy Act 1976 (1976 chapter 76) is an Act of the Parliament of the United Kingdom which empowered the Secretary of State to control the production, supply, acquisition and use of fuels and electricity, and included measures for the conservation of fuels.

Background 
The Fuel and Electricity (Control) Act 1973 had been enacted during the 1973 oil crisis, but had to be renewed annually.  The Government thought it would be expedient to put these emergency powers on a permanent basis. The Energy Act 1976 enacted this provision and included a number of other energy related requirements. The Government wished to develop policies for the conservation of energy, and to comply with European Council directives and enforce EEC (EU) regulations in the energy field. Furthermore, there were a number of provisions in existing legislation that needed to be updated. These included the regulation of flaring and venting unignited gas into the atmosphere. The British Gas Corporation was relieved from its obligation under the Gas Act 1972 to meet demands for new or additional supplies of gas to large users. It provided the Secretary of State with the power to make Orders requiring the fuel consumption of cars to be made public. It also raised the upper limit of the contributions payable under Section 2 of the Electricity Act 1972 from £25 million to £45 million.

The Energy Act 1976 
The Energy Act 1976 (1976 chapter 76) received Royal Assent on 22 November 1976. Its long title is ‘An Act to make further provision with respect to the nation's resources and use of energy’.

Provisions 
The Act comprises 23 Section and 4 Schedules

Permanent and reserve powers for energy conservation and control

 Section 1 General control by order
 Section 2 Reserve power to control by government directions
 Section 3 Implementation of reserve powers
 Section 4 Other powers
 Section 5 Temporary relief from restrictive practices law

Maintenance of fuel reserves

 Section 6 Bulk stocks of petroleum, etc.
 Section 7 Fuel stocks at power stations

Offshore natural gas

 Section 8 Supply of offshore natural gas
 Section 9 Use and liquefaction of offshore natural gas
 Section 10 Supplementary provisions as to consents
 Section 11 Interpretation of ss.8 to 10

Other measures for controlling energy sources and promoting economy

 Section 12 Disposal of gas by flaring, etc.
 Section 13 Restriction on obligation to supply gas
 Section 14 Fuelling of new and converted power stations
 Section 15 Passenger car fuel consumption

Miscellaneous and general

 Section 16 Finance for power projects
 Section 17 Orders and directions
 Section 18 Administration, enforcement and offences
 Section 19 Penalties
 Section 20 Financial provision
 Section 21 Interpretation
 Section 22 Repeals and savings
 Section 23 Citation, commencement and extent

Schedules

 Schedule 1 Relaxations of Road Traffic and Transport Law Permissible under Section 4(2)
 Schedule 2 Administration and other matters
 Schedule 3 Community Obligations of which Breach is Punishable under this Act
 Schedule 4 Repeals and Savings

Effects of the Act 
The Act repealed the Fuel and Electricity (Control) Act 1973 except as it applied to the Channel Islands and the Isle of Man. The Act which is still in force (in 2020) includes provisions for:

 bulk stocks of petroleum
 liquefaction of offshore natural gas
 disposal of gas by flaring
 fuelling of new and converted power stations
 passenger car fuel consumption.

Amendments 
Section 8 of the 1976 Act was repealed by the Oil and Gas (Enterprise) Act 1982. Section 16 was repealed by the Electricity Act 1989. Sections 12A and 12B were inserted by the Energy Act 2016.

See also 

 Timeline of the UK electricity supply industry

References 

United Kingdom Acts of Parliament 1976
Electric power in the United Kingdom
History of the petroleum industry in the United Kingdom
Natural gas industry in the United Kingdom